Reena Khokhar (born 10 April 1993) is an Indian professional field hockey player who plays as a forward for the Indian national team. She was a part of the 18-member squad that represented India at the 2018 World Cup making her comeback in the side.

At the club level, Khokhar plays for Madhya Pradesh Hockey Academy.

References

External links

 Reena Khokhar at Hockey India

1993 births
Indian female field hockey players
Field hockey players from Punjab, India
Sportswomen from Punjab, India
Living people
Female field hockey forwards
Field hockey players at the 2018 Asian Games
Asian Games silver medalists for India
Asian Games medalists in field hockey
Medalists at the 2018 Asian Games
Field hockey players at the 2020 Summer Olympics
Olympic field hockey players of India